Alen Smailagić (born 18 August 2000) is a Serbian professional basketball player for Partizan Belgrade of the Serbian KLS, the Adriatic League and the EuroLeague.

Smailagić was the youngest player in history to play in the NBA G League.

Early career
Smailagić was born in Belgrade, FR Yugoslavia (present-day Serbia).

Smailagić started to play basketball with his hometown club Beko. In 2012, he joined their youth system. In the 2017–18 season, Smailagić played for Beko in the Junior Serbian League and averaged 21.7 points, 11.1 rebounds and 1.9 blocks per game over 19 games. He was named the Junior Serbian League MVP.

Professional career

Beko (2017–2018) 
Smailagić made his senior debut for Beko of the semi-professional 3rd-tier Serbian Regional League in the 2017–18 season. Over ten league games, he averaged 15.9 points, 5.0 rebounds and 2.1 blocks per game.

Santa Cruz Warriors (2018–2019) 
On 20 October 2018, Smailagić was selected as the 4th pick on the 2018 NBA G League draft by the South Bay Lakers, but he was traded right away to the Golden State Warriors-affiliated Santa Cruz Warriors, which makes him the youngest player in the history of the NBA G League. Smailagić made his debut for the Warriors on 3 November 2018, scoring 3 points in 7 minutes he spent on the court. Over 47 league games, he averaged 9.1 points, 4.0 rebounds and 1.0 assists per game.

Golden State Warriors (2019–2021)
Smailagić was drafted as the 39th pick of the 2019 NBA draft by the New Orleans Pelicans. He is the third international player drafted into the NBA from the NBA G League, joining Greek forward Thanasis Antetokounmpo and Nigerian center Chukwudiebere Maduabum, and the seventh overall to play in the NBA’s official minor league before being drafted by an NBA team. Smailagić was then traded to the Golden State Warriors in exchange for the draft rights to two future second-round picks along with cash considerations. Smailagić officially signed a multi-year contract with the Warriors on 11 July 2019. Smailagić made his regular-season debut on 27 December 2019, recording 4 points and a rebound in a 105–96 win over the Phoenix Suns.

On 4 August 2021, the Warriors waived Smailagić. He appeared in 29 games (one start) over two seasons with Golden State, averaging 3.0 points and 1.5 rebounds in 7.7 minutes per game.

Partizan (2021–present)
On August 6, 2021, Smailagić officially signed a three-year deal with his hometown club Partizan Belgrade, under head coach Željko Obradović.

National team career
Smailagić was a member of the Serbian under-16 national team that competed at the 2016 FIBA Europe Under-16 Championship in Radom, Poland. Over seven tournament games, he averaged 5.0 points, 5.7 rebounds and 0.3 assists per game.

Career statistics

NBA

|-
| style="text-align:left;"|
| style="text-align:left;"|Golden State
| 14 || 0 || 9.9 || .500 || .231 || .842 || 1.9 || .9 || .2 || .3 || 4.2
|-
| style="text-align:left;"|
| style="text-align:left;"|Golden State
| 15 || 1 || 5.6 || .407 || .400 || .333 || 1.1 || .3 || .2 || .3 || 1.9
|- class="sortbottom"
| style="text-align:center;" colspan="2"|Career
| 29 || 1 || 7.7 || .463 || .304 || .720 || 1.5 || .6 || .2 || .3 || 3.0

Personal life 
Smailagić's father comes from Dubovo, while his mother comes from Lipica, with both places being located in Tutin, Raška District.

See also 
 List of Serbian NBA players

References

External links
 Alen Smailagić at aba-liga.com
 Alen Smailagić at eurobasket.com
 Alen Smailagić at gleague.nba.com
 Alen Smailagić at realgm.com
 

2000 births
Living people
ABA League players
Basketball players from Belgrade
Golden State Warriors players
KK Kotež Beko players
KK Partizan players
National Basketball Association players from Serbia
New Orleans Pelicans draft picks
Power forwards (basketball)
Santa Cruz Warriors players
Serbian expatriate basketball people in the United States
Serbian men's basketball players